Victoria Rimell (born 1974) is a British classicist and Professor of Latin at the University of Warwick. Among her publications are books on Ovid, Martial and Petronius.

Career
Rimell studied Classics at King's College, Cambridge where she received a BA and an MPhil degree. She then moved to King's College, London, graduating with a PhD in 2001. After working at University College, Oxford, and Cambridge University, she took up a position at Sapienza University of Rome in 2004. Since 2016, she has worked at Warwick University as an Associate Professor and, from 2018, as a Professor. She also serves on the council of the Society for the Promotion of Roman Studies. In 2020, she was elected a member of the Academia Europaea.

Selected publications
Petronius and the Anatomy of Fiction, Cambridge University Press, 2002
 Ovid’s Lovers: Desire, Difference, and the Poetic Imagination, Cambridge University Press, 2006
 Martial’s Rome: Empire and the Ideology of Epigram, Cambridge University Press, 2008
 The Closure of Space in Roman Poetics: Empire’s Inward Turn, Cambridge University Press, 2015

References

British classical scholars
Women classical scholars
Living people
Alumni of King's College London
Alumni of King's College, Cambridge
1974 births
Members of Academia Europaea